The Govt Senior Model School, Civil Lines Patiala was founded in 1956 along with its sister institution Senior Model School, Pheel Khana, Patiala as part of a 'Model School' program of Government of Punjab. The school was inaugurated by Maharani Mohinder Kaur wife of then Maharaja of Patiala, Yadavindra Singh.

The school has now been upgraded to senior secondary status, courses being offered are arts, commerce and sciences. The school also has a separate junior wing for classes up to 5th standard.

The Senior Model School, Civil Lines Patiala is affiliated with Punjab School Education Board and has enrolment of over 1200 students in classes from nursery to 12th grade.

High schools and secondary schools in Patiala
1956 establishments in East Punjab
Educational institutions established in 1956